Goodbye Charlie is a 1964 American comedy film directed by Vincente Minnelli and starring Tony Curtis, Debbie Reynolds and Pat Boone. The film is about a callous womanizer who gets his just reward. It was adapted from George Axelrod's 1959 play Goodbye, Charlie. The play provided the basis for the 1991 film Switch, with Ellen Barkin and Jimmy Smits.

Plot
Philandering Hollywood writer Charlie Sorrel (Harry Madden) is shot and killed by Hungarian film producer Sir Leopold Sartori (Walter Matthau) when he is caught fooling around with Leopold's wife, Rusty (Laura Devon). Charlie's best and only friend, novelist George Tracy (Tony Curtis), arrives at Charlie's Malibu beach house for the memorial service, after an exhausting series of flights from Paris that have left him broke. There are only three people there, Charlie's agent and two ex-girlfriends. George does his best to eulogize his friend but there is little to be said in favor of Charlie, whose final bad joke on George is making him executor of his estate — which is a mess of debts and unpaid taxes.

Soon after the guests leave, an exhausted George is awakened by a knock at the terrace door and the appearance of Bruce Minton III (Pat Boone) assisting a petite blonde woman (Debbie Reynolds) swathed in a huge brown overcoat. Bruce came to her aid when he found her dazed and wandering on the road, completely naked. She does not remember much, but she recognized Charlie's house as they drove past it and it made her feel safe. Bruce rushes off to a dinner engagement, leaving a sleep-deprived George to cope with the delirious woman. The next morning, George awakes to her screams. It all comes back to her: She is Charlie, reincarnated as a woman. After getting over the shock, she convinces George of her identity by telling him about a dirty trick that she had recently played on him as a man. George realizes that this must be a case of karmic retribution for all of the women Charlie has used and betrayed.

All manner of complications arise as Charlie decides to take advantage of the situation. George helps her by establishing her as Charlie's widow, figuring out their finances — they are both broke — and boosting her morale. From the beginning, Charlie finds herself subject to a whole new set of emotions and sensations. Her masculine mannerisms begin to fade, partly because Charlie is a consummate actor, but also because the change is more than skin deep. At one point, she bursts into uncontrollable tears. George comforts her as he would comfort a weeping girl, wiping her tears and stroking her hair to calm her down, and then pulls back, disturbed at the tenderness.

Although Charlie has changed her gender, she is unable to change her ways: she decides to solve her money problems by using her intimate knowledge for blackmail and by marrying Bruce for money. The plans fall apart when Bruce, on the verge of passing out, reveals the depth of his love for her. Charlie takes pity on him and slips the engagement ring into his hand.

Eventually, in a grim role reversal that she recognizes all too well when it happens, Charlie ends up being chased around the house by Leopold, who cheerfully spouts amorous nonsense but is, in fact, intent on rape. Rusty arrives, gun in hand, and just as Charlie climbs onto the terrace railing to jump, Rusty shoots her; she plunges into the ocean below. George, who has arrived in the midst of the mélée, leaps after Charlie, but there is no sign of a body. After lecturing the Sartoris for their actions, George orders them to leave and never tell anyone about it. The couple reconcile and Leopold promises eternal gratitude to George.

George is asleep in a chair; the sound of a woman's voice calling "Charlie" over and over again wakes him. This time there are two beings on the terrace — a woman (Debbie Reynolds) and her Great Dane, Charlie. George quickly establishes her bona fides as a real person, Virginia Mason. She takes one look at him and decides he needs food. She commands Charlie to sit and stay. Virginia and George talk in the kitchen; it is clearly love at first sight. The dog goes into the living room, to the bookcase, to Charlie's secret cache of vodka (behind War and Peace). The bottle falls and breaks; Charlie laps a bit from the floor and looking heavenward, begins to howl.

Cast

Original play

George Axelrod's play debuted on Broadway in 1959 starring Lauren Bacall and Sydney Chaplin, produced by Leland Hayward, and directed by Axelrod himself. It was not a big success, running for only 109 performances. The New York Times wrote it played like "an extended vaudeville sketch".

Production
Film rights to the play were bought before it premiered by 20th Century Fox for $150,000 plus a percentage of the profits. James Garner and Marilyn Monroe were discussed as stars.

Darryl F. Zanuck offered the project to Billy Wilder after he returned to Fox, but Wilder turned it down, saying "no self-respecting picture maker would ever want to work for your company". (Zanuck had just forced Joseph L. Mankiewicz to re-cut Cleopatra (1963)).

Playwright Harry Kurnitz was hired to write the script and Tony Curtis was attached early. Vincente Minnelli was hired to direct, his first movie away from MGM since 1942.

Reception
According to Fox records, the film needed to earn $7 million in rentals in order for the studio to break even on its release. The film ultimately failed to make this goal, making only $4,555,000.

Diabolique magazine later wrote "It's not that shocking to see the star of Spartacus (1960)... make moves on a woman not knowing she's a man, but it is a surprise to see Boone to do it. He later admitted to having a drinking problem around this time and shot some scenes for the movie while drunk.... This film remains resolutely undiscovered by queer/feminist film analysts, despite its subject matter and bisexual director... I think this is in part because Reynolds’ performance is so utterly sexless. It holds any feeling of kinkiness at bay. However, there's no denying it because Boone plays a guy who effectively tries to make out with a dude." The magazine also pointed out the opening scene features a tracking shot at a party where a man gets upset and shoots the man sleeping with his wife just like in Boogie Nights (1997).

Television adaptation
In 1985, Goodbye Charlie was made into a TV series (starring Suzanne Somers as the reincarnated Charlie), but only the pilot episode was broadcast.

See also
List of American films of 1964

References

External links 
 
 
 
Review of film at New York Times
 

1964 films
1960s fantasy comedy films
American fantasy comedy films
American films based on plays
Films about reincarnation
American LGBT-related films
Films directed by Vincente Minnelli
Films with screenplays by Harry Kurnitz
Films scored by André Previn
20th Century Fox films
1964 comedy films
CinemaScope films
1960s English-language films
1960s American films